The Porsche LMP2000 (also known as the Porsche 9R3) is a Le Mans Prototype racing car that was developed between 1998 and 2000, but never raced. One car was built, and it was designed around a modified version of Porsche's 3.5-litre V10 engine that was originally designed for Formula 1 in 1992. The project was canceled before the car was built, leading to various rumors about the reason for its demise.

Design and development
In 1998 Porsche designed a Le Mans Prototype for the following season, assigning it the codename 9R3. It was initially to use a modified version of the turbocharged flat-six engine found in the Porsche 911 road car, but, although the design was completed in November 1998, Porsche opted against building the car. Due to the inherent flaws of using the heavy flat-six and the extra cooling the engine would've needed, Porsche instead redeveloped the 3.5-litre V10 engine that was originally developed in 1992 for Formula One, to replace the V12 used by Footwork Arrows; it was redesigned for both 5-litre and 5.5-liter capacities, and the pneumatic valve springs were removed, as the air restrictors mandated under LMP regulations made them redundant. The chassis was unaltered apart from suspension geometry for newer tires and the engine mountings to accommodate the new engine. In May 1999 the project was halted, but the chassis was completed and underwent a two-day private test, driven by Allan McNish and Bob Wollek who reportedly gave positive feedback.

Despite Porsche's initial denial of the 9R3's existence rumours circulated about its cancellation including: the engineers were diverted to the Porsche Cayenne SUV project; to avoid competing with its Audi R8 stablemate which won the 2000 24 Hours of Le Mans; insufficient competition after the withdrawal of BMW, Toyota, Nissan and Mercedes-Benz. The engine from the car was used in the Porsche Carrera GT concept car and was detuned for the production version.

In July 2018, the car was seen in public for the first time at the Goodwood Festival of Speed, as part of the 70th anniversary celebrations of Porsche.

References

Le Mans Prototypes
Sports prototypes
Mid-engined cars
Rear-wheel-drive vehicles
LMP2000